Iken Wood is a  biological Site of Special Scientific Interest south of Snape in Suffolk. It is in the Suffolk Coast and Heaths Area of Outstanding Natural Beauty.

This is probably the only ancient coppice wood on blown sand in Britain. Other trees include silver birch, holly and rowan.

The site is private land with no public access.

References

Sites of Special Scientific Interest in Suffolk